Eric David Osswald (born November 3, 1991) is an American soccer player.

Career

Youth, College and Amateur
Osswald spent his youth career with the Columbus Crew Academy before signing a letter of intent to play college soccer at the University of South Florida.  After redshirting his freshman year with the Bulls, Osswald made 13 appearances from 2011 to 2012 before transferring to Xavier University.

In his two seasons with the Musketeers, Osswald made 39 appearances and recorded 17 clean sheets.  In 2014, he set a school record for clean sheets with 11 and a 0.74 goals against average on his way to being named NSCAA All-Great Lakes Region First Team, Big East Goalkeeper of the Year and All-Big East First Team.

Osswald also played in the Premier Development League for Carolina Dynamo, VSI Tampa Flames and Cincinnati Dutch Lions.

Professional
On January 8, 2015, it was announced that Osswald would take part in Major League Soccer's player combine.  However, he went undrafted in the 2015 MLS SuperDraft.  He later joined USL expansion side Real Monarchs SLC for the 2015 season and made his professional debut on April 25 in a 1–0 defeat to LA Galaxy II.

References

External links
Xavier Musketeers bio

1991 births
Living people
American soccer players
South Florida Bulls men's soccer players
Xavier Musketeers men's soccer players
North Carolina Fusion U23 players
VSI Tampa Bay FC (PDL) players
Cincinnati Dutch Lions players
Real Monarchs players
Association football goalkeepers
Soccer players from Ohio
USL League Two players
USL Championship players
People from Powell, Ohio